The Magic Pills (Les Pilules magiques) is a ballet-féerie in 3 acts/13 scenes, with choreography by Marius Petipa and music by Ludwig Minkus.

The ballet was first presented by the Imperial Ballet on February 9/21 (Julian/Gregorian calendar dates), 1886 at the Imperial Mariinsky Theatre in St. Petersburg, Russia. Principal Dancers: Varvara Nikitina.

This ballet was presented in honor of the inauguration of the Mariinsky Theatre as the Imperial Ballet and Opera's principal venue in 1886.

See also 
 List of ballets by title

Ballets by Marius Petipa
Ballets by Ludwig Minkus
1866 ballet premieres
Ballets premiered at the Mariinsky Theatre